FC Strausberg, simply known as Strausberg or FCS, is a German association football club based in Strausberg, the largest city in Märkisch-Oderland, Brandenburg. The club, that plays home games at the "Energiearena", has senior (players aged 35 years and over) and junior branches, including children.

History
The football club was founded in 1956 as Vorwärts Strausberg and it has mainly played in regional football leagues. Few years after German reunification, in 1995, the club was re-created with the current name, as the football department of the "KSC Strausberg", the local association regarding sport and culture.

Since 2005, Strausberg played in the Brandenburg-Liga, which was held in the following years with midfield places. In the 2012–13 season it won the championship and reached the NOFV-Oberliga Nord.

Honours
The club's honours:
 Brandenburg-Liga
 Champions: 2013

Symbol and colors
The logo of the club represents an ostrich playing football in a blue and white shield. It is derived, as a parody, from the coat of arms of the town.

References

External links
 Official website of FC Strausberg

Football clubs in Germany
FC Strausberg
Football clubs in East Germany
Football clubs in Brandenburg
Association football clubs established in 1956
1956 establishments in East Germany